RobotDNA is an animation studio founded in 1987 as Garner MacLennan Design (GMD). It initially produced digital design, animation and visual effects for television. Achievements include BDA and Promax awards for broadcast design and commercials such as a CLIO Award-winning Dr Pepper spot. It later engaged in interactive database marketing, digital television, WebTV, broadband communications and digital applications for film and television. GMD was re-structured as robotDNA in 2004.

Work
Arena "Network IDs" (1996)
SF "Network Launch" (1998)
SheTV "Network Launch" (1998)
Nickelodeon USA "Relaunch" (1999)
Disney Channel "Merry Christmas" (2000)
Farscape (special effects) (2000)
Nickelodeon UK "Nicktrition" (2005)

See also

List of film production companies
List of television production companies

References

External links
Official Website

Australian animation studios
Entertainment companies of Australia
Mass media companies established in 1987
1987 establishments in Australia